Turquino National Park, also known as Sierra Maestra National Park,  is a national park in Santiago de Cuba Province, southeastern Cuba.

Geography

The park is located in the Sierra Maestra mountain range.

It was established on January 8, 1980, with the passing of bill 27/1980.

Other mountains in Turquino National Park include Pico Cuba, Pico Real, and Pico Suecia.

Ecology
The park has tropical forest habitats, including the lower elevation Cuban moist forests and higher elevation Cuban pine forests ecoregions.

The park's area includes a section of Cuba's southeastern coast habitat, at the beach of Marea del Portillo.

See also
National parks of Cuba
Geography of Santiago de Cuba Province

References

External links

National parks of Cuba
Geography of Santiago de Cuba Province
Protected areas established in 1980
Tourist attractions in Santiago de Cuba Province